Julius "Julie" Seligson (December 22, 1909, in New York City – October 13, 1987) was an American tennis player in the early part of the 20th century.

Seligson was ranked as high as # 8 in USTA Singles in 1928. In 1928 he won the NCAA Men's Tennis Championship in singles. He was inducted into the Intercollegiate Tennis Association (ITA) Men’s Collegiate Tennis Hall of Fame.

Early and personal life
Seligson was born in New York City, New York, and was Jewish, and experienced anti-Semitism in tennis. He attended Columbia Grammar & Preparatory School.

In 1937 he married Gertrude "Gerry" Seligson (nee Goodman).  They lived in Westport, Connecticut, from 1948 on.

Tennis career

As a junior he was the national boy's 18-and-under champion in 1925 and 1926.  In 1927 he won the Eastern Grass Court Championships.

He played collegiate tennis at Lehigh University in Pennsylvania, from which he graduated in 1930.  Seligson never lost a regular season match.  In 1928 he won the NCAA Men's Tennis Championship in singles, beating Ben Gorchakoff 6–1, 6–1, 6–1, to become Lehigh’s first individual national champion.
 He won 66 straight matches, before losing in the 1930 NCAA finals 6–3, 3–6, 6–2, 8–6 to Cliff Sutter of Tulane.

He won the NCAA indoor singles championship in 1928, 1929, and 1930.  In 1930 he also won the Eastern Clay Court Championships.

Seligson was ranked as high as # 8 in USTA Singles in 1928.

In 1928 and 1930, he was a singles finalist at the U.S. National Indoor Tennis Championships. In 1929, at the Cincinnati Masters, he reached the singles final, where he lost to Herbert Bowman in four sets:  6–2, 4–6, 4–6, 1–6.

He later turned professional and won three titles at the Metropolitan Clay Court Championship.

Halls of Fame

In 1992, he was inducted into the Lehigh University Athletic Hall of Fame, and in 2002 he was enshrined into the Intercollegiate Tennis Association (ITA) Men’s Collegiate Tennis Hall of Fame.

After tennis career

After graduation he became an insurance broker.

Seligson died in 1987 of a malignant melanoma at his home in Westport, Connecticut.  He was 77 years old.

See also
List of select Jewish tennis players

References

External links
Jews in Sports bio

Lehigh University alumni
Jewish tennis players
1909 births
Jewish American sportspeople
Sportspeople from New York City
1987 deaths
American male tennis players
Tennis people from New York (state)
Columbia Grammar & Preparatory School alumni
20th-century American Jews
College men's tennis players in the United States